Bosnia and Herzegovina competed at the 2012 Winter Youth Olympics in Innsbruck, Austria. The Bosnia and Herzegovina team consisted of 4 athletes in 3 sports.

Alpine skiing

Bosnia and Herzegovina qualified one boy and one girl.

Boy

Girl

Cross country skiing

Bosnia and Herzegovina qualified one boy.

Boy

Sprint

Luge

Bosnia and Herzegovina qualified one boy.

Boy

See also
Bosnia and Herzegovina at the 2012 Summer Olympics

References

2012 in Bosnia and Herzegovina sport
Nations at the 2012 Winter Youth Olympics
Bosnia and Herzegovina at the Youth Olympics